Lieutenant Colonel Sir Hector William van Cuylenburg, VD (23 January 1847 – 11 December 1915) was a Ceylonese lawyer, newspaper proprietor and legislator. He was elected as the first unofficial member representing the Burghers in the Legislative Council of Ceylon.

Early life and education
Hector William van Cuylenburg was born on 23 January 1847, the son of Dr Petrus Henricus van Cuylenburg, the Assistant Colonial Surgeon in the Colonial Medical Department of
Ceylon and Eliza Morgan, the fourth of nine children. He was educated at S. Thomas' College and Queen's College, Colombo.

Legal career
After completing his schooling, he served an apprenticeship with Charles Ambrose Lorensz and in 1868 was called to the bar as a proctor. He started his practice in Kalutara and later moved to Colombo. In 1876 he was engaged as a Crown Proctor by the Queen's Advocate, following which he became a member of Gray's Inn becoming a barrister and on his return to Ceylon became an advocate. In 1886 he competed in the Wimbledon Cup and in 1894 in the Queen's Prize.

Military service
In 1881 he was among the first individuals to join the Ceylon Volunteer Force, and continued to serve on their active list until 1911, when he retired with the brevet rank of Lieutenant Colonel having served as the second-in-command of the Ceylon Light Infantry Volunteers under the command of Lieutenant Colonel Richard Hillebrand Morgan and was awarded the Volunteer Officers' Decoration.

Ceylon Independent
In 1888 van Cuylenberg together with William Maitland, established the first daily morning paper, the Ceylon Independent, the first edition of which was published on 4 July. The paper's initial editor  was Mr Heath, the former Reuters Agent in Colombo, however he died a few months after the paper was established. In 1889 a new editor for the paper, George Wall, was appointed, who agitated for a more responsible form of government for the country. Van Cuylenberg remained editor-in-chief until 1898 when he relinquished the position to J. Scott Coates.

Legislative Council
In 1911 van Cuylenburg became the first elected Burgher representative in the Legislative Council of Ceylon,. He was elected with 829 votes, with H Geo Thomas and Arthur Alvis receiving 466 votes and 273 votes respectively. A total of 1,568 Burghers (72.9%) of the total 2,149 registered voters casting their vote. Sir Hector van Cuylenburg held the position until his death in December 1915.

Honors
In 1913 he was elected as the fourth president of the Dutch Burgher Union of Ceylon. In 1914 van Cuylenburg was appointed a Knight Bachelor.

Family
On 10 July 1872 he married his cousin, Joselina Sissouw née Morgan, daughter of Sir Richard Morgan, the 13th Queen's Advocate of Ceylon and acting Chief Justice of Ceylon; and they had one child, Captain Hector Richard Henry Morgan van Cuylenburg, Barrister from Gray's Inn (b. 3 November 1875).

References

1847 births
1915 deaths
Alumni of S. Thomas' College, Mount Lavinia
Alumni of Queen's College, Colombo
People from British Ceylon
Members of the Legislative Council of Ceylon
Ceylonese Knights Bachelor
Sri Lankan barristers
Ceylonese advocates
Ceylonese proctors
Ceylon Light Infantry officers